Abdul Rahim Ansari is a Nepalese politician. He is a member of Provincial Assembly of Madhesh Province belonging to the People's Socialist Party, Nepal. Ansari, a resident of Sakhuwa Prasauni Rural Municipality, was elected via 2017 Nepalese provincial elections from Parsa 3(A) constituency. He garnered 7,004 votes during the election.

Personal life
Ansari was born on 12 April 1978 to father Chaughur Miya and mother Nirbani Khatun.

Electoral history

2017 Nepalese provincial elections

References

Living people
1978 births
21st-century Nepalese politicians
Madhesi people
Nepalese Muslims
Members of the Provincial Assembly of Madhesh Province
People's Socialist Party, Nepal politicians